Bereslavka (formerly known as Yanovka or Yanivka) is a village in Kropyvnytskyi Raion, Kirovohrad Oblast, Ukraine. The village has a population of 139 (2001). Bereslavka was part of the Vasilyevka village council and belongs to Ketrysanivka rural hromada, one of the hromadas of Ukraine. It is the birthplace of Marxist theorist and politician Leon Trotsky as well as his sister, Olga Kameneva.

Until 18 July 2020, Bereslavka belonged to Bobrynets Raion. The raion was abolished in July 2020 as part of the administrative reform of Ukraine, which reduced the number of raions of Kirovohrad Oblast to four. The area of Bobrynets Raion was merged into Kropyvnytskyi Raion.

References

Villages in Kropyvnytskyi Raion